Giuseppe Pezzella (born 29 November 1997) is an Italian professional footballer who plays as a left back for  club Lecce, on loan from Parma.

Club career

Palermo
Pezzella is a youth product from Palermo. He made his Serie A debut with the senior side on 6 December 2015 against Atalanta, replacing Mato Jajalo after 65 minutes of a 3–0 away defeat.

Udinese
On 30 June 2017, Pezzella joined Udinese on a five-year contract.

Loan to Genoa
On 21 January 2019, Pezzella joined to Genoa on loan with an option to buy until 30 June 2019.

Parma
On 27 August 2019, Pezzella signed to Parma a five-year contract, but he was on loan until the end of 2019–20 season, with an obligation to buy.

Loan to Atalanta
On 27 July 2021, Pezzella moved to Atalanta on a season-long loan with option to buy, which would have become an obligation to buy if certain conditions were met.

Loan to Lecce
On 26 August 2022, Pezzella was loaned by Lecce, with an option to buy.

International career
With the Italy U-20 side, Pezzella took part at the 2017 FIFA U-20 World Cup, winning the bronze medal. The same year, he was also called up by the Italy U-21 manager Luigi Di Biagio for the 2017 UEFA European Under-21 Championship, following Nicola Murru's injury, although he did not appear in the tournament. Italy were eliminated by Spain in the semi-finals of the competition on 27 June, following a 3–1 defeat.

Pezzella made his debut with the Italy U21 team on 1 September 2017, in a 3–0 friendly loss against Spain.

Career statistics

Club

References

External links

1997 births
Living people
Footballers from Naples
Italian footballers
Association football forwards
Association football fullbacks
Serie A players
Palermo F.C. players
Udinese Calcio players
Genoa C.F.C. players
Parma Calcio 1913 players
Atalanta B.C. players
U.S. Lecce players
Italy under-21 international footballers
Italy youth international footballers